This is the discography for American pop musician Steve Lawrence.

Albums 
 Steve Lawrence (1953, King)
 About That Girl (1956, Coral)
 Songs by Steve Lawrence (1957, Coral)
 Here's Steve Lawrence (1958, Coral)
 All About Love (1959, Coral)
 Swing Softly with Me (1959, ABC-Paramount)
 Songs Everybody Knows (1960, Coral)
 We Got Us with Eydie Gorme (1960, ABC-Paramount)
 Steve & Eydie Sing the Golden Hits with Eydie Gorme (1960, ABC-Paramount)
 Best of Steve Lawrence (1960, ABC-Paramount)
 The Steve Lawrence Sound (1960, United Artists)
 Steve Lawrence Goes Latin (1960, United Artists)
 Portrait of My Love (1961, United Artists)
 Our Best to You with Eydie Gorme (1961, ABC-Paramount)
 Cozy with Eydie Gorme (1961, United Artists)
 It's Us Again (1962, Silvirkin shampoo)
 People Will Say We're In Love (1962, United Artists)
 Winners! (1962, Columbia)
 Come Waltz With Me (1962, Columbia)
 Two on the Aisle with Eydie Gorme (1962, United Artists)
 Steve Lawrence Conquers Broadway (1963, United Artists)
 Swinging West (1963)
 Steve & Eydie At the Movies with Eydie Gorme (1963)
 That Holiday Feeling with Eydie Gorme (1964)
 Academy Award Losers (1964, Columbia)
 What Makes Sammy Run? (1964, Columbia)
 The Steve Lawrence Show (1965, Columbia)
 Steve Lawrence's Greatest Hits(1965, Columbia)
 Together on Broadway with Eydie Gorme (1967, Columbia)
 Sing of Love and Sad Young Men (1967)
 Bonfá & Brazil with Eydie Gorme (1967)
 Moon River(1967, Harmony)
 Golden Rainbow (1968)
 I've Gotta Be Me (1969)
 Real True Lovin''' with Eydie Gorme (1969)
 What It Was, Was Love with Eydie Gorme (1969)
 Ramblin' Rose(1969, Harmony)
 The More I See You(1969, Vocalion)
 On A Clear Day – Steve Sings Up A Storm (1970)
 A Man and a Woman with Eydie Gorme (1970)
 Love me with all your heart(1970, Harmony)
 Go Away Little Girl(1971, Harmony)
 Portrait of Steve (1972)
 The World Of Steve & Eydie with Eydie Gorme (1972)
 Feelin' with Eydie Gorme (1972, Stage 2)
 Our Love is Here to Stay: The Gershwin Years with Eydie Gorme (1976)
 Tu Seras Mi Musica (1977)
 My Way (1977)
 Take It On Home (1981)
 Hallelujah with Eydie Gorme (1984)
 Through the Years with Eydie Gorme (1984)
 Alone Together with Eydie Gorme (1989)
 Greatest 20th Century Songs (2000)
 Warm Hours (2000)
 Academy Award Losers + 7 Bonus Track (2001)
 Songs My Friends Made Famous (2001)
 Sings of Love & Sad Young Men/Portrait of Steve (2001)
 Steve Lawrence Sings Sinatra (2003)
 Winners/On a Clear Day (2005)
 Love Songs From The Movies  (2005)
 Steve Lawrence Sound/Portrait of My Love (2005)
 Steve Lawrence Show + 4 Bonus Track (2009)
 When You Come Back to Me Again (2014)
 Steve Lawrence Conquers Broadway'' (2014)

Singles

References 

discographies of American artists
Pop music discographies